Therkildsen is a predominantly Danish patronymic surname from the name Therkild. People bearing the name include:

Hans Michael Therkildsen (1850–1925), Danish painter
Mogens Therkildsen (born 1940), Danish footballer 
Morten Therkildsen (born 1983), Danish racing cyclist 
Peter Therkildsen (born 1998), Danish footballer
Rasmus Therkildsen (born 1991), Danish singer

See also
Thorkildsen
Torkelsen
Torkildsen

Danish-language surnames